USS Worcester (CL-144) was a ship in the United States Navy, and the third ship to carry that name, honoring Worcester, Massachusetts. Worcester was the lead ship of a class of light cruisers. She was launched just after the close of World War II, and decommissioned in 1958.

Description and design

Worcester combined destroyer maneuverability with cruiser size, with a main battery that could deal with both surface targets and aircraft. In addition, the fire control fitted to Worcester was optimized for anti-aircraft fire rather than surface action or naval gunfire support.

Construction and career 
Worcester was laid down on 29 January 1945 at Camden, New Jersey, by the New York Shipbuilding and Drydock Corp., and launched on 4 February 1947. Sponsored by Gloria Ann Sullivan, the daughter of Mayor F. G. Sullivan of Worcester, Massachusetts, she was commissioned at the Philadelphia Naval Shipyard on 26 June 1948.

Worcester was assigned to Cruiser Division 10. She spent the first year of her commissioned service completing her fitting out, conducting shakedown training, undergoing availability and type training off the eastern seaboard of the United States. In the summer of 1949, she participated in her first large-scale training exercises in Guantanamo Bay and visited Kingston, Jamaica. Later that summer, she sailed for the Mediterranean, departing Newport, Rhode Island, on 6 September and reaching Gibraltar 10 days later. She made her first deployment with the 6th Fleet in the ensuing months, visiting Malta; Bizerte, Tunisia; Golfe-Juan, France; Argostoli and Phaleron Bay, Greece; İskenderun, Turkey; Trieste and Venice, Italy; and Gibraltar. During her 6th Fleet deployment, she engaged in exercises and maneuvers with fast carrier task forces, including the carrier  and the heavy cruiser . She returned to Norfolk, Virginia on 10 December.

Worcester operated off the eastern seaboard, ranging from Newport to Norfolk and south to Puerto Rico, with visits in between to Philadelphia, before she began her second 6th Fleet deployment in the spring of 1950. She departed Norfolk on 3 May, arrived at Lisbon on 13 May, and entered the Mediterranean soon thereafter.

In between her cycles of drills and exercises in the Mediterranean, Worcester visited Augusta, Sicily; Bizerte; Genoa and La Spezia, Italy; and Golfe Juan, on the southern coast of France, before she was put into Phaleron Bay on 20 July. She was there only for a week before she received orders to sail for the Far East. While the light cruiser and her consorts had been operating in the Mediterranean, war had broken out in Korea on 25 June. Reaching Port Said, Egypt, on the morning of 29 July, Worcester transited the Suez Canal that afternoon.

Reaching Colombo for provisions and fuel, Worcester and her escorts tarried there from 7 August to 9 August before pushing on towards the Malacca Strait. They then proceeded through the Bashi Channel to Buckner Bay, Okinawa, where they arrived on 19 August. En route, the American warships had been diverted through the Bashi Channel to be available to counter any invasion attempt by the communist Chinese of Formosa.

Joining that force on 21 August, Worcester remained at anchor at Keelung from 22 through 26 August.

On 28 August, the light cruiser—steaming in company with Norris—joined TF 77 and proceeded into the Yellow Sea for operations against enemy targets located in the central and southwestern Korea. Each day in ensuing days, the carriers launched their strikes against North Korean ground targets while the screen provided protection in case of any attempts by the communist North Korean air forces to interrupt the operation. Worcesters helicopter also performed plane-guard duty, standing by in the air to rescue any ditched pilots from the waters nearby.

On 4 September, Worcesters radar picked up an unidentified contact at 13:31. The combat air patrol—four Vought F4U Corsairs from Valley Forge—soon reported the stranger as being a twin-engine bomber with a pointed nose, a single tailfin, and high inverted gull wings. It also bore red star markings.

Three minutes later, the cruiser fired three rounds of 6-inch projectiles in the direction of the intruder to warn her—it turned out to be a British Short Sunderland flying boat on patrol. At 21:43, Worcester secured from battle stations and resumed her cruising with TF 77.

There was one more day of flight operations off the Korean coast, 6 September, before Worcester transferred her helicopter to Philippine Sea to clear the ship for a practice anti-aircraft firing. The cruiser later recovered the helicopter before heading for Sasebo, Japan, for replenishment of fuel, ammunition, stores, and provisions.

Worcester remained at Sasebo from 7 to 10 September and got underway at 05:32 on 11 September, again with TF 77, and proceeded to the operation area in the Yellow Sea to support a large-scale amphibious assault by United Nations (UN) forces against enemy forces in the Inchon and Seoul areas of Korea.

Worcester subsequently supported the Inchon landing — an attack aimed at outflanking the North Korean invaders by a strategic landing behind their lines in South Korea masterminded by General Douglas MacArthur. Worcester screened the fast carrier task forces as their planes dropped lethal loads on North Korean targets ashore until she was detached on 20 September to conduct a shore bombardment mission as part of TG 95.2 in the vicinity of Pohang Dong. Proceeding to the objective via the straits north of the Quelpart Islands and west of Tsushima, the light cruiser rendezvoused with  three miles off the east coast of Korea and 12 miles north of Pohang Dong.

Over the following days, Worcester patrolled off the coast with TG 95.2. She relieved Helena in her fire support duties at 06:00 on 24 September, freeing the heavy cruiser to proceed to Sasebo. While her own helicopter was aloft providing anti-submarine screening, Worcester commenced firing at 08:05, shelling nine North Korean troop concentrations ashore. Directed by Korean Military Advisory Group (KMAG) personnel ashore, Worcester delivered call-fire throughout the day with pinpoint accuracy at troop concentrations and command posts.

Worcester returned the following day and resumed her fire support duties, adding to the troubles of the retreating North Korean forces. Throughout 25 September, Worcester—using KMAG spotting from shore—delivered fire support for the advancing UN forces, breaking up communist troop concentrations with 6-inch fire. As the ship's war diary at one point recorded: "Spotter reported troops dispersed. KMAG reported that all firing has been very effective and instrumental in enemy retreat."

Worcester spent the night hours on 25 September and into 26 September patrolling eight miles of a stretch of coast between Yonghae and Utchin. The rapid advance of the UN forces on 26 September obviated fire support from Worcesters guns; but the cruiser received word that Brush had hit a naval mine off Tanchon, North Korea, at 12:20.

The cruiser found Brush down by the bow with a 3-degree port list. There were five dead and 30 injured. At 01:01 on 27 September, Worcester commenced taking on board the more seriously wounded of the destroyer's company via highline transfer, eventually receiving 15 stretcher cases—all men suffering from burns—by 02:28. The cruiser then altered course for Japan and, later that day, took on board four more stretcher patients, six ambulatory patients, and a corpse. At that time, two hospitalmen—who had been transferred from Worcester to Brush to tend the wounded on the destroyer—returned to the cruiser.

As she was being made fast to her buoy in Sasebo harbor, Worcester received a warm message from the destroyer that she had aided: "With us you are not only big league but world champions. The kindness, consideration and eagerness to help Worcester's ship's company will never be forgotten by the Brush."

The stay in Sasebo, however, proved a short one for Worcester, because she got underway on the 30th to return to Korean waters to resume her fire support and interdiction duties. At 06:00 on 1 October, Worcester joined the blockading force off the east coast of Korea, south of the 41st parallel, ready to render gunfire support for UN troops advancing against North Korean forces. As she patrolled off the coast, Worcester launched her helicopter to conduct anti-submarine and anti-mine patrols and frequently stationed lookouts in the bows of the ship, their eyes peeled for mines. Periodically, the screening destroyers found and destroyed mines drifting nearby.

Worcester—having served as flagship for TG 95.2, Rear Admiral C. C. Hartman embarked—arrived back at Sasebo for replenishment on 8 October and fueled there before disembarking Rear Admiral Hartman. While still at Sasebo, Worcester became a flagship again the next day when Rear Admiral Allan E. Smith, Commander, TF 95 came aboard. At 12:48 on 10 October, Worcester got underway to return to the east coast of Korea—this time to screen minesweeping operations at the port of Wonsan and to support the advance of the 3rd Republic of Korea (ROK) Army Division.

On 12 October, the battleship  joined.

While Missouris helicopter searched the projected bombardment track for mines, the UN force formed up for battle. At 11:50, when a shell from an unobserved shore battery fell  short of the group, it apparently signaled the beginning. Worcester hoisted the blue and white UN flag to the foretruck and commenced firing at exactly noon on 12 October. For almost the next 90-odd minutes, Worcesters 6-inch guns hammered at iron works and railroad tunnels in the vicinity. The next day, she extended her target list to include railroad marshalling yards, tearing up sections of track and blasting rolling stock.

Over the next few days, Worcester and the ships accompanying her proceeded to rain destruction on targets of opportunity near Wonsan—targets that ranged from railroad marshalling yards to rolling stock and adjacent warehouse areas. Also, on 16 October, Worcester, Helena, and accompanying destroyers fired at unidentified radar contacts—"blips" on the radar screens that approached from the northward.

Worcester completed the transfer of helicopter personnel, spares, and equipment to Fleet Activities, Sasebo, and, at 17:01 on 23 October, headed for Yokosuka. She reached that port at 08:23 two days later. After replenishment, liberty for her crew, and the cleaning of two boilers, the light cruiser left the Far East on 27 October, bound for Pearl Harbor. The day after she sailed, Worcester received a dispatch from Admiral C. Turner Joy, Commander, Naval Forces, Far East, which said: "Upon the Worcesters departure from the Far East I wish to extend a hearty 'well done' to the entire ship's company. Your rapid deployment from the European station to the Far East, followed by your immediate and most effective participation in the Korean effort, clearly demonstrates that your status of war readiness was excellent."

Returning to Philadelphia on 21 November—via Pearl Harbor and the Panama Canal—Worcester later spent six days at Norfolk, 23 to 29 November, before she was overhauled at the Boston Naval Shipyard from 1 December 1950 to 20 March 1951. After another brief period at Norfolk from 22 to 30 March, the light cruiser operated at Guantanamo Bay on refresher training for nearly a month before she headed back to Norfolk. Departing that port on 15 May, Worcester headed for the Mediterranean and her third deployment to the 6th Fleet.

Worcester conducted four more 6th Fleet "Med" deployments into the mid-1950s and twice visited northern European ports. During that time, she participated in fleet maneuvers and exercises and paid good-will calls on many ports—ranging from Bergen, Norway; to Copenhagen, Denmark; to Dublin, Ireland; and Portsmouth, England. Between her foreign deployments were operations closer to home: local operations out of eastern seaboard ports like Boston and Norfolk. In addition, the ship also plied the warmer waters of the Caribbean and West Indies, ranging from Guantanamo Bay to Kingston, Jamaica.

Transferred from the Atlantic to the Pacific Fleet in January 1956, Worcester made two more deployments to operate with the 7th Fleet, visiting such highly frequented ports as Sasebo and Yokosuka, Japan; Hong Kong; Manila; as well as the Japanese ports of Hakodate, Nagasaki, Shimoda, Yokohama, and Kobe. Returning each time to her home port at Long Beach, California, the ship conducted local operations between her cruises in Pacific waters.

Decommissioning 
On 2 September 1958, Worcester departed Long Beach and steamed for the Mare Island Naval Shipyard to commence the inactivation process. She was decommissioned at Mare Island on 19 December 1958 and simultaneously placed in reserve. Worcester was subsequently berthed at San Francisco and later, at Bremerton, Washington, before she was struck from the Navy list on 1 December 1970. She was sold to Zidell Explorations, Inc., of Portland, Oregon, for disposal on 5 July 1972. The light cruiser, that never had a chance to prove herself in her designed role, was subsequently broken up for scrap.

Approximately 200 tons of her armor plate was sent to the Fermi National Accelerator Laboratory in Batavia, Illinois, west of Chicago, and the armor is being used for absorption shielding in the particle accelerator and experiment lines.

The bell of USS Worcester is on display at the first floor near back entrance of Worcester City Hall.

Gallery

Awards 

 World War 2 Navy Occupation Medal with "Asia" and "Europe" clasps
 China Service Medal
Combat Action Ribbon 
 National Defense Service Medal
 Korean Service Medal with 2 awards
 Republic of Korea Presidential Unit Citation
 United Nations Korea Medal
 Republic of Korea War Service Medal

References

Sources

External links 

 USS Worcester Association
  USS Worcester at NavSource.org

 

Worcester-class cruisers
Ships built by New York Shipbuilding Corporation
1947 ships
Cold War cruisers of the United States
Korean War cruisers of the United States